Sabzi khordan, kanachi,(), goy or pinjar (Kurdish: pinçar) is a common side dish in Iranian, Kurdish, Azerbaijani,
Afghan, and Armenian cuisines, which may be served with any meal, consisting of any combination of a set of fresh herbs and raw vegetables. Basil, parsley, and radishes are among the most common ones.

Most commonly it is served alongside the actual meal. It is sometimes served with feta cheese and naan bread (lavash, sangak, barbari) and also walnuts, to prepare a loqmeh (Persian: لقمه; meaning roll up bite) which is colloquially called Naan panir sabzi.

A list of the vegetables used in sabzi khordan is as follows:

Gallery

See also
 List of salads

References

Vegetable dishes
Iranian cuisine
Armenian cuisine
Azerbaijani cuisine
Afghan cuisine
Kurdish cuisine
Salads